1910 Шемелько-денщик або Хохол наплутав / Shemelko-Denshchyk, directed by Oleksandr Ostroukhov-Arbo
 1912 Запорізька січ / Zaporizhian Sich, directed by Danylo Sakhnenko
 1912 Любов Андрія / Andriy's Love, directed by Danylo Sakhnenko
 1913 Полтава / Poltava, directed by Danylo Sakhnenko
 1913 Жизнь Евреев в Палестине / The Life of the Jews in Palestine / חיי היהודים בארץ ישראל‎ / La vie des Juifs en Palestine, directed by 

1880s|1890s|1900s|1910s
Films
Ukrainian